Phocylides, Greek gnomic poet of Miletus, contemporary of Theognis of Megara, was born about 560 BC.

A few fragments of his "maxims" have survived (chiefly in the Florilegium of Stobaeus), in which he expresses his contempt for the pomps and vanities of rank and wealth, and sets forth in simple language his ideas of honour, justice and wisdom. An example is an epigram quoted by Dio Chrysostom:

Aristotle also found cause to quote him:

Works
Phocylides of Miletus was once credited with writing Pseudo-Phocylides, a complete didactic poem (230 hexameters). However, that text is now considered to be the work of an Alexandrian Christian of Jewish origin who lived between 170 BC and AD 50. The Jewish element is shown in verbal agreement with passages of the Old Testament (especially the Wisdom of Sirach); the Christian by the doctrine of the immortality of the soul and the resurrection of the body. Some Jewish authorities, however, maintain that there are in reality no traces of Christian doctrine to be found in the poem, and that the author was a Jew. The poem was first printed at Venice in 1495, and was a favourite school textbook during the Reformation period.

See also
 Pseudo-Phocylides
 Theognis of Megara

References

Further reading
Fragments and the spurious poem in T. Bergk, Poetae lyrici graeci, II, pp. 74–109 (4th ed., 1882).
Jakob Bernays Über das Phokylideische Gedicht (1858)
Phocylides, Poem of Admonition, with introduction and commentaries by J. B. Feuling, and translation by H. D. Goodwin (Andover, Massachusetts, 1879)
Franz Susemihl, Geschichte der griechischen Litteratur in der Alexandrinerzeit, (1892), ii. 642
E. Schürer, History of the Jewish People, div. ii., vol. iii., 313—316 (English translation 1886), where full bibliographies are given.
English translation by W. Hewett (Watford, 1840), The Perceptive Poem of Phocylides.
M. L. West, 'Phocylides,' Journal of Hellenic Studies 98, 164–7.

Attribution

Ancient Greek poets
6th-century BC poets
Year of death unknown
560s BC births